XACT can refer to:

 Cross-platform Audio Creation Tool, an audio system developed by Microsoft
 IP-XACT, an XML-based standard covering electronic components
 Xact Radio, a former brand used by broadcaster WNTY in the United States

See also
 Extortion